Wierzbanowa  is a village in the administrative district of Gmina Wiśniowa, within Myślenice County, Lesser Poland Voivodeship, in southern Poland.

The village has a population of 600.

References

Wierzbanowa